The Commandant of the National Defence College in India is the overall in-charge of all the functioning of the National Defence College including academics and administration. The Commandant of the college is a Three-star rank officer from the three Services in rotation for a term of two years. He is supported by five Senior Directing Staff from the three services and one each from the Civil Service and the Foreign Service. Administration is looked after by the Secretary under the Commandant and is supported by a number of Staff Officers.

History
In July 1959, Lieutenant General Kanwar Bahadur Singh was appointed the first Commandant of the college. By the end of the year, he formulated detailed plans including the aim and the charter of NDC as well as the scope of studies at the college. The Chiefs of Staff cleared approved them on December 25, 1959.

List of Commandants

List of Commandants by branches of service
Army - 13Navy - 11Air Force - 9

See also 

 Commandant of the Indian Military Academy
 Commandant of the National Defence Academy
 Commandant of Indian Naval Academy

References

Indian Army
Military academies of India
Indian military appointments